Maksan (also Romanized as Maksān and Makasān; also known as Magasān) is a village in Bazman Rural District, Bazman District, Iranshahr County, Sistan and Baluchestan Province, Iran. At the 2006 census, its population was 714, in 142 families.

References 

Populated places in Iranshahr County